Coed Morgan is a village and rural area in Monmouthshire, south east Wales, in the United Kingdom.

Location 

Coed Morgan is situated four miles east of Abergavenny close to the villages of Llanddewi Rhydderch and Llanarth.

History and amenities 

Coed Morgan is set in rolling Monmouthshire countryside with a range of agricultural uses.

External links
www.geograph.co.uk : photos of Coed Morgan and surrounding area

Villages in Monmouthshire